Guioa asquamosa is a species of plant in the family Sapindaceae. It is endemic to Timor and Flores in Indonesia. It is a vulnerable species threatened by habitat loss.

References

asquamosa
Flora of the Lesser Sunda Islands
Vulnerable plants
Taxonomy articles created by Polbot